Alex Kofi Mensah Mould is a Ghanaian chemical engineer and politician who is a former Chief Executive Officer of Ghana National Petroleum Corporation. He is a member of the National Democratic Congress of Ghana. Before he was appointed CEO of GNPC, he was the CEO of National Petroleum Authority.

Early life and education 
Mould attended Accra Academy and graduated in 1978. He proceeded to the Kwame Nkrumah University of Science and Technology where he studied Chemical engineering. He graduated from the university in 1985 with a Bachelor of Science degree. He enrolled at the College of Petroleum Studies, Oxford where he obtained a Postgraduate diploma in Oil Marketing and Economics in 1989.  In 1994, he obtained a Master of Business Administration degree in finance, Accounting and Decision Science from J.L Kellogg Graduate School, Northwestern University, Illinois.

Career 
After graduating from the Kwame Nkrumah University of Science and Technology, Mould was posted to do his one-year national service at the newly created Ghana National Petroleum Corporation in 1985. After service, he was employed by the corporation as a Chemical engineer. He rose through the ranks to become a special assistant to the CEO of GNPC in the area of marketing. In 1997, Mould resigned from the corporation and was appointed as a senior associate at Structured Trade Finance Americas of UBS Investment Bank from 1997 to 1999. He moved banks and was employed as associate director of Commodity Finance at Standard Chartered Bank in New York from 1999 to 2001. Mould was moved to the Ghana branch of Standard Chartered Bank in 2001. He remained the Director and Co-Head of the Wholesale department till 2008.

National appointments 
When the John Atta Mills administration was voted into power in 2009, Mould was appointed chief executive officer of the National Petroleum Authority. He remained in the position till 2012. In January 2013, when the John Dramani Mahama administration took over the reins of government, Mould was sent to the Ghana National Petroleum Corporation as its chief executive. He took over from Nana Boakye Asafu Adjaye, who had headed the corporation since 2009. He remained in the position till the end of the John Mahama administration. In January 2017, he was replaced by Kofi Koduah Sarpong.

Personal life 
Mould is a brother to Betty Mould-Iddrisu a former Minister of Justice under the John Atta Mills administration and a former Minister of Education under the John Dramani Mahama administration. He lost his daughter, Naa Densua to Malaria on 1 January 2020. This was when she was on holiday in Mauritius.

References

Living people
National Democratic Congress (Ghana) politicians
Ghanaian chemical engineers
Kwame Nkrumah University of Science and Technology alumni
Northwestern University alumni
Alumni of the Accra Academy
Ghanaian bankers
Year of birth missing (living people)